In trigonometry, trigonometric identities are equalities that involve trigonometric functions and are true for every value of the occurring variables for which both sides of the equality are defined. Geometrically, these are identities involving certain functions of one or more angles. They are distinct from triangle identities, which are identities potentially involving angles but also involving side lengths or other lengths of a triangle.

These identities are useful whenever expressions involving trigonometric functions need to be simplified. An important application is the integration of non-trigonometric functions: a common technique involves first using the substitution rule with a trigonometric function, and then simplifying the resulting integral with a trigonometric identity.

Pythagorean identities 

The basic relationship between the sine and cosine is given by the Pythagorean identity:

where  means  and  means 

This can be viewed as a version of the Pythagorean theorem, and follows from the equation  for the unit circle. This equation can be solved for either the sine or the cosine:

where the sign depends on the quadrant of 

Using these identities, it is possible to express any trigonometric function in terms of any other (up to a plus or minus sign):

Reflections, shifts, and periodicity 
By examining the unit circle, one can establish the following properties of the trigonometric functions.

Reflections 

When the direction of a Euclidean vector is represented by an angle  this is the angle determined by the free vector (starting at the origin) and the positive -unit vector. The same concept may also be applied to lines in a Euclidean space, where the angle is that determined by a parallel to the given line through the origin and the positive -axis. If a line (vector) with direction  is reflected about a line with direction  then the direction angle  of this reflected line (vector) has the value

The values of the trigonometric functions of these angles  for specific angles  satisfy simple identities: either they are equal, or have opposite signs, or employ the complementary trigonometric function.

Shifts and periodicity

Signs 

The sign of trigonometric functions depends on quadrant of the angle.

Angle sum and difference identities 

They can also be derived by using a slightly modified version of the figure for the angle sum identities, both of which are shown here.

These identities are summarized in the first two rows of the following table, which also includes sum and difference identities for the other trigonometric functions.

Sines and cosines of sums of infinitely many angles 
When the series  converges absolutely then

Because the series  converges absolutely, it is necessarily the case that   and   In particular, in these two identities an asymmetry appears that is not seen in the case of sums of finitely many angles: in each product, there are only finitely many sine factors but there are cofinitely many cosine factors.  Terms with infinitely many sine factors would necessarily be equal to zero.

When only finitely many of the angles  are nonzero then only finitely many of the terms on the right side are nonzero because all but finitely many sine factors vanish.  Furthermore, in each term all but finitely many of the cosine factors are unity.

Tangents and cotangents of sums 
Let  (for ) be the th-degree elementary symmetric polynomial in the variables

for  that is,

Then

using the sine and cosine sum formulae above.

The number of terms on the right side depends on the number of terms on the left side.

For example:

and so on. The case of only finitely many terms can be proved by mathematical induction.

Secants and cosecants of sums 

where  is the th-degree elementary symmetric polynomial in the  variables   and the number of terms in the denominator and the number of factors in the product in the numerator depend on the number of terms in the sum on the left. The case of only finitely many terms can be proved by mathematical induction on the number of such terms.

For example,

Ptolemy's theorem 

Ptolemy's theorem is important in the history of trigonometric identities, as it is how results equivalent to the sum and difference formulas for sine and cosine were first proved (see the section on classical antiquity in the page History of trigonometry). It states that in a cyclic quadrilateral , as shown in the accompanying figure, the sum of the products of the lengths of opposite sides is equal to the product of the lengths of the diagonals. In the special cases of one of the diagonals or sides being a diameter of the circle, this theorem gives rise directly to the angle sum and difference trigonometric identities. The relationship follows most easily when the circle is constructed to have a diameter of length one, as shown here.

The right-angled triangles  and  both share the hypotenuse  of length 1.

By the inscribed angle theorem, the central angle subtended by the chord  at the circle's center is twice the angle , i.e. . Therefore, the symmetrical pair of red triangles each has the angle  at the center. The quadrilateral's other diagonal is the diameter of length 1, so the product of the diagonals' lengths is also .

When these values are substituted into the statement of Ptolemy's theorem that , this yields the angle sum trigonometric identity for sine: .

Multiple-angle formulae

Multiple-angle formulae

Double-angle formulae 

Formulae for twice an angle.

Triple-angle formulae 
Formulae for triple angles.

Multiple-angle and half-angle formulae

Chebyshev method 
The Chebyshev method is a recursive algorithm for finding the th multiple angle formula knowing the th and th values.

.

This can be proved by adding together the formulae

It follows by induction that  is a polynomial of  the so-called Chebyshev polynomial of the first kind, see Chebyshev polynomials#Trigonometric definition.

Serving a purpose similar to that of the Chebyshev method, for the tangent we can write:

Half-angle formulae 

Also

Table 

These can be shown by using either the sum and difference identities or the multiple-angle formulae.

The fact that the triple-angle formula for sine and cosine only involves powers of a single function allows one to relate the geometric problem of a compass and straightedge construction of angle trisection to the algebraic problem of solving a cubic equation, which allows one to prove that trisection is in general impossible using the given tools, by field theory. 

However, the discriminant of this equation is positive, so this equation has three real roots (of which only one is the solution for the cosine of the one-third angle). None of these solutions is reducible to a real algebraic expression, as they use intermediate complex numbers under the cube roots.

Power-reduction formulae 

Obtained by solving the second and third versions of the cosine double-angle formula.

Product-to-sum and sum-to-product identities
The product-to-sum identities or prosthaphaeresis formulae can be proven by expanding their right-hand sides using the angle addition theorems. Historically, the first four of these were known as Werner's formulas, after Johannes Werner who used them for astronomical calculations. See amplitude modulation for an application of the product-to-sum formulae, and beat (acoustics) and phase detector for applications of the sum-to-product formulae.

Hermite's cotangent identity 

Charles Hermite demonstrated the following identity. Suppose  are complex numbers, no two of which differ by an integer multiple of . Let

(in particular,  being an empty product, is 1). Then

The simplest non-trivial example is the case :

Finite products of trigonometric functions 

For coprime integers , 

where  is the Chebyshev polynomial.

The following relationship holds for the sine function

More generally for an integer 

or written in terms of the chord function ,

This comes from the factorization of the polynomial  into linear factors (cf. root of unity): For a point  on the complex unit circle and an integer ,

Linear combinations 
For some purposes it is important to know that any linear combination of sine waves of the same period or frequency but different phase shifts is also a sine wave with the same period or frequency, but a different phase shift.

Sine and cosine 
The linear combination, or harmonic addition, of sine and cosine waves is equivalent to a single sine wave with a phase shift and scaled amplitude,

given that

Arbitrary phase shift 
More generally, for arbitrary phase shifts, we have

where  and  satisfy:

More than two sinusoids 
The general case reads

where

and

Lagrange's trigonometric identities 
These identities, named after Joseph Louis Lagrange, are:

for 

A related function is the Dirichlet kernel:

Certain linear fractional transformations 
If  is given by the linear fractional transformation

and similarly

then

If  is the slope of a line, then  is the slope of its rotation through an angle of

Relation to the complex exponential function 

Euler's formula states that, for any real number x:

where i is the imaginary unit. Substituting −x for x gives us:

These two equations can be used to solve for cosine and sine in terms of the exponential function.  Specifically,

These formulae are useful for proving many other trigonometric identities.  For example, that
 means that

That the real part of the left hand side equals the real part of the right hand side is an angle addition formula for cosine.  The equality of the imaginary parts gives an angle addition formula for sine.

The following table expresses the trigonometric functions and their inverses in terms of the exponential function and the complex logarithm.

Infinite product formulae 
For applications to special functions, the following infinite product formulae for trigonometric functions are useful:

Inverse trigonometric functions 

The following identities give the result of composing a trigonometric function with an inverse trigonometric function.

Taking the multiplicative inverse of both sides of the each equation above results in the equations for 
The right hand side of the formula above will always be flipped.

The following identities are implied by the reflection identities. They hold whenever  are in the domains of the relevant functions.

Also,

The arctangent function can be expanded as a series:

Identities without variables 

In terms of the arctangent function we have

The curious identity known as Morrie's law,

is a special case of an identity that contains one variable:

Similarly,

is a special case of an identity with :

For the case ,

For the case ,

The same cosine identity is

Similarly,

Similarly,

The following is perhaps not as readily generalized to an identity containing variables (but see explanation below):

Degree measure ceases to be more felicitous than radian measure when we consider this identity with 21 in the denominators:

The factors 1, 2, 4, 5, 8, 10 may start to make the pattern clear: they are those integers less than  that are relatively prime to (or have no prime factors in common with) 21. The last several examples are corollaries of a basic fact about the irreducible cyclotomic polynomials: the cosines are the real parts of the zeroes of those polynomials; the sum of the zeroes is the Möbius function evaluated at (in the very last case above) 21; only half of the zeroes are present above. The two identities preceding this last one arise in the same fashion with 21 replaced by 10 and 15, respectively.

Other cosine identities include:

and so forth for all odd numbers, and hence

Many of those curious identities stem from more general facts like the following:

and

Combining these gives us

If  is an odd number we can make use of the symmetries to get

The transfer function of the Butterworth low pass filter can be expressed in terms of polynomial and poles. By setting the frequency as the cutoff frequency, the following identity can be proved:

Computing  
An efficient way to compute  to a large number of digits is based on the following identity without variables, due to Machin. This is known as a Machin-like formula:

or, alternatively, by using an identity of Leonhard Euler:

or by using Pythagorean triples:

Others include:

In particular, the computed  will be rational whenever all the  values are rational. With these values,

where in all but the first expression, we have used tangent half-angle formulae.  The first two formulae work even if one or more of the  values is not within .  Note that if  is rational, then the  values in the above formulae are proportional to the Pythagorean triple .

For example, for  terms,

for any .

An identity of Euclid 
Euclid showed in Book XIII, Proposition 10 of his Elements that the area of the square on the side of a regular pentagon inscribed in a circle is equal to the sum of the areas of the squares on the sides of the regular hexagon and the regular decagon inscribed in the same circle. In the language of modern trigonometry, this says:

Ptolemy used this proposition to compute some angles in his table of chords in Book I, chapter 11 of Almagest.

Composition of trigonometric functions 
These identities involve a trigonometric function of a trigonometric function:

where  are Bessel functions.

Further "conditional" identities for the case α + β + γ = 180° 

Historical shorthands 

The versine, coversine, haversine, and exsecant were used in navigation. For example, the haversine formula was used to calculate the distance between two points on a sphere. They are rarely used today.

Miscellaneous

Relationship between all trigonometric ratios 
The following identities each give a relationship between all the trigonometric ratios.

Similarly,

Dirichlet kernel 

The Dirichlet kernel  is the function occurring on both sides of the next identity:

The convolution of any integrable function of period  with the Dirichlet kernel coincides with the function's th-degree Fourier approximation. The same holds for any measure or generalized function.

Tangent half-angle substitution 

If we set  then

where  sometimes abbreviated to .

Viète's infinite product

See also 

 Aristarchus's inequality
 Derivatives of trigonometric functions
 Exact trigonometric values (values of sine and cosine expressed in surds)
 Exsecant
 Half-side formula
 Hyperbolic function
 Laws for solution of triangles:
 Law of cosines
 Spherical law of cosines
 Law of sines
 Law of tangents
 Law of cotangents
 Mollweide's formula
 List of integrals of trigonometric functions
 Mnemonics in trigonometry
 Pentagramma mirificum
 Proofs of trigonometric identities
 Prosthaphaeresis
 Pythagorean theorem
 Tangent half-angle formula
 Trigonometric number
 Trigonometry
 Trigonometric constants expressed in real radicals
 Uses of trigonometry
 Versine and haversine

References

Bibliography

External links 
 Values of sin and cos, expressed in surds, for integer multiples of 3° and of °, and for the same angles csc and sec and tan
 Complete List of Trigonometric Formulas

Mathematical identities
Identities
Mathematics-related lists